Heartbreak in Stereo is the debut and only studio album by the American rock band Pencey Prep.

Content
The nineteen track album was released on compact disc and digital download with Eyeball Records, on November 26, 2001. The album is produced by John Naclerio and was recorded at Nada Studios in Newburgh, New York, except for "Fat and Alone," which was produced by Antonio Valenti and recorded at HinchKraft Studios in North Haledon, New Jersey. Mastering is by Alan Douches at West West Side. Album artwork is by Neil Sabatino, with photography by Dahlia Nardone, and Jamie Schaefer. Heartbreak in Stereo is described as vicious, but unfocused hardcore punk rock. It features Frank Iero in "full berserker mode," with screaming, howling, and raging vocals.

On recording for Heartbreak in Stereo, Iero says "I tried not to hold anything back, [which is] the way I feel about music and performing."

In November 2020 the band re-released a limited edition vinyl version of the album through Kingsroad Merch, along with a CD pressing. On November 16, 2020, the band announced they would be releasing the album digitally with Frank Iero's B.CALM Press and Neil Sabatino's Mint 400 Records. In November 2021, the first ever pressing of the album on cassette tape was announced.

Track listing

Original 2001 release

2020/2021 re-release

Personnel
Tim Hagevik – drums and percussion
John 'Hambone' McGuire – bass guitar and vocals
Frank Iero – rhythm guitar, lead guitar and lead vocals
Neil Sabatino – lead guitar, rhythm guitar, vocals, illustration and graphic design
Shaun Simon – keyboards, synthesizers and Moog

Additional musicians
John Nacliero – additional vocals on "10 Rings" and "The Secret Goldfish"
Bruno Rocha – additional vocals on "Yesterday"

References
Citations

Bibliography

External links

2001 debut albums
Pencey Prep albums